Raksha Nikhil Khadse is a politician from Maharashtra and belongs to the Bhartiya Janta Party. She represents the Raver Loksabha seat in lower house of Indian parliament.

Personal life
Khadse was born in Khetia, Madhya Pradesh. Raksha Khadse is the daughter-in-law of senior NCP leader of Maharashtra Eknath Khadse. She is the widow of his son Nikhil Khadse.
On 22 February 2021 various newspapers reported that she is tested positive to COVID-19.

Political career
Khadse elected as Sarpanch of Kothadi village. later she was elected to Jalgaon Zila Parishad. In the 2014 Lok Sabha elections, she defeated Manish Jain of Nationalist Congress Party by margin of 318608 votes. She obtaining 605452 while Jain received 287384 votes. At the age of 26, she along with Heena Gavit, became the youngest MP in the 16th Lok Sabha.

She got re-elected in 2019 for a second term as MP of Raver Loksabha.

Positions held
 2010 to 2012 - Sarpanch of Kothali Grampanchayat.
 2012 to 2014 - Member Zillah Parishad, Jalgaon, Maharashtra.
 2012 to 2014 - Chairperson (Sabhapati) Health, Education & Sports Committee, Zillah Parishad, Jalgaon, Maharashtra.
 2014 to present - Member of Parliament for Raver Loksabha constituency, Maharashtra.

References

External links
Official biographical sketch in Parliament of India website

Living people
India MPs 2014–2019
India MPs 2019–present
Bharatiya Janata Party politicians from Maharashtra
Lok Sabha members from Maharashtra
Marathi politicians
People from Jalgaon district
Women in Maharashtra politics
21st-century Indian women politicians
21st-century Indian politicians
1987 births